Frilford Heath, Ponds and Fens is a  biological Site of Special Scientific Interest in Frilford, west of Abingdon in Oxfordshire.

Natural England describes the acid grassland, heathland and valley fens of this site as unique in southern England. Over 400 vascular plants have been recorded, including some which are nationally rare. There are unusual insects such as the wasp Microdynerus exilis, which was only recognised as native to Britain in the late twentieth century, the red data book of threatened species fly Cheilosia mutabilis, and the nationally uncommon Epistrophe diaphana.

There is no public access the main site, which is almost all on Frilford Heath Golf Course, but Hitchcopse Pit is open to the public.

References

 

Sites of Special Scientific Interest in Oxfordshire